Tartu Academy of Theology is a private university in Tartu, Estonia, founded on 16 September 1992.

See also
 List of universities in Estonia

References

External links
 

Universities and colleges in Estonia
Academy of Theology
Educational institutions established in 1992
Christian seminaries and theological colleges
1992 establishments in Estonia